Molla Ali (also Romanized as Mollā ‘Alī and Mulla-Ali) is a village in Kuhgir Rural District, Tarom Sofla District, Qazvin County, Qazvin Province, Iran. At the 2006 census, its population was 54, in 16 families.

References 

Populated places in Qazvin County